The Italian women's national ice hockey team, a.k.a. Blue Ladies, represents Italy at the International Ice Hockey Federation's IIHF World Women's Championships. The women's national team is controlled by the Federazione Italiana Sport del Ghiaccio (FISG).  Italy has about 490 female players in 2011.

Tournament record

Olympic Games
2006 – Finished in 8th place

World Championship
1999 – Finished in 17th place (1st in Pool B)
2000 – Finished in 16th place (8th in Pool B)
2001 – Finished in 19th place (2nd in Division II/A)
2003 – Finished in 18th place (4th in Division II)
2004 – Finished in 17th place (2nd in Division II)
2005 – Finished in 16th place (2nd in Division II)
2007 – Finished in 17th place (2nd in Division II)
2008 – Finished in 19th place (4th in Division II)
2009 – Finished in 19th place (4th in Division II)
2011 – Finished in 17th place (4th in Division II)
2012 – Finished in 20th place (6th in Division IB)
2013 – Finished in 22nd place (2nd in Division IIA)
2014 – Finished in 21st place (1st in Division IIA)
2015 – Finished in 19th place (5th in Division IB)
2016 – Finished in 18th place (4th in Division IB)
2017 – Finished in 19th place (5th in Division IB)
2018 – Finished in 16th place (1st in Division IB, promoted to Division IA)
2019 – Finished in 16th place (6th in Division IA, relegated to Division IB)
2020 – Cancelled due to the COVID-19 pandemic
2021 – Cancelled due to the COVID-19 pandemic
2022 – Finished in 18th place (3rd in Division IB)

Team

Current roster
The roster for the 2022 IIHF Women's World Championship Division I Group B tournament.

Head coach: Massimo FedrizziAssistant coaches: Stefano Daprà, Martin Pavlu

Head coaches
 Markus Sparer, –2005
 Herbert Frisch, 2006–07
 Marco Liberatore, 2007–2019
 Massimo Fedrizzi, 2021–

References

External links

IIHF profile
National Teams of Ice Hockey

 
Ice hockey teams in Italy
Women's national ice hockey teams in Europe
1993 establishments in Italy